Crupet Castle (also known as the Château des Carondelet), is a medieval moated donjon or fortified farmhouse (ferme-château) in the village of Crupet, Wallonia, since 1977 part of the municipality of Assesse, province of Namur, Belgium.  It was built in the 11th or 12th century, and the lords of the castle later became vassals of Liège.

Sources 

"Carondelet Castle". Castles.NL. Accessed 1 December, 2019.  https://www.castles.nl/carondelet-castle

See also

List of castles in Belgium
Crupet castle as Lego castle

Castles in Belgium
Castles in Namur (province)